"I'd Lie for You (And That's the Truth)" is a song composed and written by Diane Warren, and recorded by Meat Loaf and Patti Russo. The song was released in October 1995 as the first single from Meat Loaf's seventh studio album, Welcome to the Neighbourhood (1995). The single release reached  2 in the United Kingdom and No. 13 in the United States.

Music video
The music video for "I'd Lie for You" was directed by Howard Greenhalgh with cinematography by Daniel Pearl, who had also photographed the music video for "I'd Do Anything for Love (But I Won't Do That)". The storyline appears to start out as a continuation of the ending of the "I'd Do Anything...," video, but quickly morphs into a big budget concept piece that borrows heavily from the Indiana Jones film series. Meat Loaf and the girl companion continue riding into the desert, now pursued by a helicopter, while being simultaneously observed by a chiseled-looking Indiana Jones-type "action hero" and a foreign military despot (played by Xander Berkeley). The motorcycle riders then abruptly vanish, only to reappear in the camp of the relic hunter who has recently discovered an ancient mask.

The 'hero' type (played by Brett Cullen, an actor who has sung backup for Meat Loaf) immediately takes interest in Meat Loaf's girl (Dana Patrick back from the previous video, lip-syncing this time to vocals supplied by Patti Russo), and she in him. What follows is standard adventure mayhem and clichéd perilous situations featuring many vehicle chases, and large explosions, while Meat Loaf alternates between playing the hero's sidekick, and singing to his beautiful love interest of his devotion from afar, as the other man seduces her. The heroine even sings her lines to the other man. In the end, the adventurer chooses the treasure over the girl and flees, leaving Meat Loaf to once again get the girl.

Formats and track listings
In Europe, the "I'd Lie for You" single was released as two CDs. The regular edition was backed with live versions of "Hot Patootie (Whatever Happened to Saturday Night?)" and "I'd Do Anything for Love", while the limited edition contained the non-album track "Oh, What a Beautiful Morning" from Oklahoma! and the album track "Runnin' for the Red Light".

US CD single
 "I'd Lie for You (And That's the Truth)" – 6:37
 "I'd Do Anything for Love" (Live in New York City, 1993) (feat. Patti Russo) – 5:27

US cassette single
 "I'd Lie for You (And That's the Truth)" – 6:37
 "I'd Do Anything for Love" (Live in New York City, 1993) (feat. Patti Russo) – 5:27

European CD single 1
 "I'd Lie for You (And That's the Truth)" (Pioneers of the West Mix) – 5:28
 "Hot Patootie (Whatever Happened to Saturday Night?)" (Live) - 3:19
 "I'd Do Anything for Love" (Live in New York City, 1993) (feat. Patti Russo) – 5:28

European CD single 2
 "I'd Lie for You (And That's the Truth)" (Fountain Head Mix)
 "Oh, What a Beautiful Morning"
 "Runnin' for the Red Light (I Gotta Life)"

Charts and certifications

Weekly charts

Year-end charts

Certifications

Release history

References

1995 singles
1995 songs
Male–female vocal duets
MCA Records singles
Meat Loaf songs
Music videos directed by Howard Greenhalgh
Number-one singles in Scotland
Song recordings produced by Ron Nevison
Songs written by Diane Warren
Virgin Records singles